The Canada women's national water polo team (French: Équipe féminine de water-polo du Canada) represents Canada in women's international water polo competitions and friendly matches. The team is overseen by Water Polo Canada, a member of the Fédération Internationale de Natation (FINA). In 1981 the team claimed its first international prize, winning the FINA Water Polo World Cup.

Results

Olympic Games

 2000 — 5th place
 2004 — 7th place
 2020 — 7th place

World Championship

FINA World Cup

 1979 — 4th place
 1980 — 
 1981 — 
 1983 — 4th place
 1988 — 
 1989 — 4th place
 1991 — 4th place
 1993 — 6th place
 1997 — 5th place
 1999 — 5th place
 2002 — 3rd place
 2006 — 7th place
 2010 — 5th place
 2018 — 6th place

FINA World League

 2004 — 5th place
 2005 — 6th place
 2006 — 6th place
 2007 — 4th place
 2009 — 
 2010 — 4th place
 2011 — 4th place
 2012 — 5th place
 2013 — 
 2014 — 4th place
 2015 — 4th place
 2016 — 7th place
 2017 — 
 2018 — 4th place
 2020 — 4th place
 2022 — 7th place

Pan American Games

 1999 — 
 2003 — 
 2007 — 
 2011 — 
 2015 — 
 2019 —

UANA Cup (ASUA Cup)

 2013a – 
 2013b – 
 2015 – 
 2019 –

Commonwealth Championship

 2002 – 
 2006 – 
 2014 – '

Holiday Cup

 1998 — 3rd place
 1999 — 2nd place
 2000 — 2nd place
 2001 — 2nd place
 2002 — 2nd place
 2003 — 3rd place
 2006 — 4th place
 2007 — 6th place
 2009 — 3rd place
 2012 — 2nd place

Team

Current squad
Roster for the 2020 Summer Olympics.

Past squads

 1981 FINA World Cup —  Gold Medal
Sylvie Archambault, Tracy Crandall, Odile Delaserra, Isabel Deschamps, Michelle Despatis, Jocelyne Dumay, Diedre Fincham, Johanne Gervais, Janice Gilbey, Heather Gifford, Hilary Knowles, Denise Préfontaine, and Sylvie Thibault. Head Coach Dominique Dion
 1983 FINA World Cup — 4th place
Odile Delaserra, Isabel Deschamps, Michelle Despatis, Diedre Fincham, Johanne Gervais, Heather Kaulbach, Hélène Miron, Denise Préfontaine, Josée Monast, Danielle Tétreault, Chantal Larocque, Marie-Claude Deslières, and Sylvie Thibault. Head Coach Dominique Dion, Assistant Coach Gaëtan Turcotte
 1986 World Championship — 4th place
Johanne Gervais, Heather Kaulbach, Nathalie Auclair, Ghislaine Brunetta, Josée Monast, Pascale Deslières, Chantal Larocque, Marie-Claude Deslières, Vicki Nickless, Melanie Nickless, Nathalie Deschênes, Marilyn Thorington, and France Bastien. Head Coach Daniel Berthelette, Assistant Coach Sylvain Huet
 1988 FINA World Cup —  Bronze Medal
Roxane Lafrance, Heather Kaulbach, Josée Martin, Ghislaine Brunetta, Caroline Boisclair, Pascale Deslières, Kim Schweltzer, Marie-Claude Deslières, Isabelle Auger, Melanie Nickless, Nathalie Deschênes, Marilyn Thorington, and France Bastien. Head Coach Daniel Berthelette
1989 FINA World Cup — 4th place
Roxane Lafrance, Heather Kaulbach, Josée Martin, Sabine Difilippo, Caroline Boisclair, Pascale Deslières, Heather Smith, Marie-Claude Deslières, Isabelle Auger, Melanie Nickless, Nathalie Deschênes, Marilyn Thorington, and France Bastien. Head Coach Daniel Berthelette, Assistant Coach Dominique Dion
 1991 World Championship —  Silver Medal
Roxane Lafrance, Heather Kaulbach, Karen Morrisson, Sabine Difilippo, Caroline Boisclair, Pascale Deslières, Heather Smith, Marie-Claude Deslières, Isabelle Auger, Karen Gibson, Nathalie Deschênes, Marilyn Thorington, and Chantal Larocque. Head Coach Daniel Berthelette, Assistant Coach Dominique Dion
 1994 World Championship — 5th place
Roxane Lafrance, Heather Kaulbach, Karen Morrisson, Sabine Difilippo, Melanie Nickless, Pascale Deslières, Andrea Hoffman, Marie-Claude Deslières, Isabelle Auger, Cora Campbell, Trina Campbell, Josée Marsolais, and Ann Dow. Head Coach Daniel Berthelette, Assistant Coach Dominique Dion
 1999 Pan American Games —  Gold Medal
Marie Luc Arpin, Johanne Bégin, Cora Campbell, Melissa Collins, Valérie Dionne, Ann Dow,  Waneek Horn-Miller, Jana Salat and Kaliya Young. Marie-Claude Deslières, Sandra Lizé, Josée Marsolais, Lila Fraser, Head Coach Daniel Berthelete, Assistant Coach David Hart
 2000 Olympic Games — 5th place
Marie-Luc Arpin, Isabelle Auger, Johanne Bégin, Cora Campbell, Melissa Collins, Marie-Claude Deslières, Valérie Dionne, Ann Dow, Susan Gardiner, Waneek Horn-Miller, Sandra Lizé, Josée Marsolais, and Jana Salat. Head Coach Daniel Berthelette, Assistant Coach David Hart, Assistant Coach Dominique Dion
 2002 Holiday Cup —  Silver Medal
Marie-Luc Arpin, Johanne Bégin, Cora Campbell, Shannon Carroll, Melissa Collins, Andrea Dewar, Valérie Dionne, Ann Dow, Nancy El-Sakkary, Nadine Gilbert (goal), Whynter Lamarre (goal), Waneek Horn-Miller, and Sandra Lizé. Head Coach: Wouly de Bie.
 2002 FINA World Cup —  Bronze Medal
Marie-Luc Arpin, Christi Bardecki, Melissa Collins, Andrea Dewar, Valérie Dionne, Ann Dow, Susan Gardiner, Sandra Lizé, Nadine Gilbert (goal), Marianne Illing, Whynter Lamarre (goal). Head Coach: Patrick Oaten.
 2003 World Championship — 4th place
Marie Luc Arpin, Christi Bardecki, Johanne Bégin, Cora Campbell, Melissa Collins, Andrea Dewar, Valérie Dionne, Ann Dow, Susan Gardiner, Marianne Illing, Rachel Riddell, Whynter Lamarre (goal), and Jana Salat. Head Coach: Patrick Oaten.
 2003 Pan American Games —  Silver Medal
Marie Luc Arpin, Christi Bardecki, Johanne Bégin, Cora Campbell, Melissa Collins, Andrea Dewar, Valérie Dionne, Ann Dow, Susan Gardiner, Marianne Illing, Whynter Lamarre (goal), Rachel Riddell, and Jana Salat. Head Coach: Patrick Oaten.
 2004 Olympic Games — 7th place
Marie Luc Arpin, Johanne Bégin, Cora Campbell, Melissa Collins, Andrea Dewar, Valerie Dionne, Ann Dow, Susan Gardiner, Marianne Illing, Whynter Lamarre, Rachel Riddell (goal), Christine Robinson, and Jana Salat. Head Coach: Patrick Oaten.
 2005 FINA World League — 6th place
Krystina Alogbo, Alison Braden, Tara Campbell, Joëlle Békhazi, Nancy El-Sakkary, Susan Gardiner, Whynter Lamarre, Katrin Monton, Dominique Perreault, Marina Radu, Rachel Riddell, Christine Robinson, and Whitney Genoway. Head Coach: Patrick Oaten.
 2005 World Championship —  Bronze Medal
Krystina Alogbo, Marie-Luc Arpin, Johanne Bégin, Cora Campbell, Tara Campbell, Valerie Dionne, Ann Dow, Susan Gardiner, Whynter Lamarre, Dominique Perreault, Rachel Riddell (goal), Christine Robinson, and Jana Salat. Head Coach: Patrick Oaten.
 2006 FINA World League — 6th place
Krystina Alogbo, Joëlle Békhazi, Alison Braden, Valerie Dionne, Susan Gardiner (captain), Whitney Genoway, Whynter Lamarre, Sandra Lizé, Dominique Perreault, Marina Radu, Rachel Riddell (goal), Christine Robinson, and Rosanna Tomiuk. Head Coach: Patrick Oaten.
 2007 World Championship — 6th place
Krystina Alogbo, Joëlle Békhazi, Alison Braden, Cora Campbell, Tara Campbell, Emily Csikos, Whynter Lamarre, Sandra Lizé, Katrina Monton, Dominique Perreault, Marina Radu, Rachel Riddell, and Christine Robinson. Head Coach: Patrick Oaten.
 2007 FINA World League — 4th place
Krystina Alogbo, Joëlle Békhazi, Alison Braden, Cora Campbell, Tara Campbell, Jenna Crook, Emily Csikos, Whynter Lamarre, Sandra Lizé, Dominique Perreault, Marina Radu, Rachel Riddell (goal), Christine Robinson, and Rosanna Tomiuk. Head Coach: Patrick Oaten.
 2007 Holiday Cup — 6th place
Krystina Alogbo, Johanne Bégin, Joëlle Békhazi, Alison Braden, Cora Campbell, Tara Campbell, Emily Csikos, Whynter Lamarre, Sandra Lizé, Katrina Monton, Dominique Perreault, Rachel Riddell (goal), Christine Robinson, and Rosanna Tomiuk. Head Coach: Patrick Oaten.
 2007 Pan American Games —  Silver Medal
Krystina Alogbo, Joëlle Békhazi, Alison Braden, Cora Campbell, Tara Campbell, Emily Csikos, Whynter Lamarre, Sandra Lizé, Dominique Perreault, Marina Radu, Rachel Riddell, Christine Robinson, and Rosanna Tomiuk. Head Coach: Patrick Oaten.
 2008 FINA Olympic Qualifying Tournament — 5th place
 Rachel Riddell, Krystina Alogbo, Sandra Lizé, Emily Csikos, Johanne Bégin, Katrina Monton, Rosanna Tomiuk, Dominique Perrault, Alison Braden, Christine Robinson, Tara Campbell, Marina Radu, and Whynter Lamarre. Head Coach: Patrick Oaten.
 2009 World Championship —  Silver Medal
. Head Coach:.
 2017 World Championship — 4th place
Jessica Gaudreault, Krystina Alogbo, Axelle Crevier, Emma Wright, Monika Eggens, Kyra Christmas, Joëlle Békhazi, Elyse Lemay-Lavoie, Hayley McKelvey, Christine Robinson, Kelly McKee, Shae Fournier, and Ymane Hage. Head Coach: Haris Pavlidis.

Under-20 team
Canada's women won the title at the 2003 FINA Junior Water Polo World Championships.

See also

 Canada women's Olympic water polo team records and statistics
 Canada men's national water polo team

References

Canada Water Polo
Canadian Sport

Women's national water polo teams
Women's water polo in Canada